The Phoenix Historic Property Register is the official listing of the historic and prehistoric properties in the city of Phoenix, the capital and largest city, of the U.S. state of Arizona.

History
The register was established on 1986 with the aim of recognizing buildings, structures, sites, objects and districts significant in local, regional, state or national history, architecture, archaeology, engineering and culture which have been deemed worthy of preservation.

The historic properties are divided into three categories and listed with a Historic Preservation zoning overlay. The categories are: Historic Residential Districts, Historic Non-Residential Districts and Individual Properties. The factors which are taken into consideration and which are included in the eligibility criteria for inclusion are:1.The historical significance of the property, 2. the age of the property (at least 50 years old) and 3. the integrity of the property (condition).

According to the Phoenix Historic Property Register, once listed, the properties are protected from demolition. However, according to Robert A. Melikian, author of the book "Vanishing Phoenix", Phoenix's preservation office does not have the ability to deny a demolition permit. Therefore, the owner of a property, listed either in the National Register of Historic Places or the Phoenix Historic Property Register, may demolish the historical property if he or she so wishes. Among the properties that have been demolished are the following:
 Arizona Citrus Growers Association Warehouse – 601 E. Jackson St.
 Craftsman Bungalow – 1241 E. Roosevelt St.

Some of the historic houses and buildings which are listed in the Phoenix Historic Property Register are also listed in the "enDangered Dozen Historic Places List," released by the Phoenix Historic Neighborhoods Coalition. These structures are prone to vandalism and the elements. Among the structures which are neglected and are at the highest risk of disappearing in the near future are the following:
 The William R. Norton House, built in 1895 and located at 2222 W. Washington St.
Norton founded the Sunnyslope subdivision of Phoenix and designed the Carnegie Library, the city’s first library, and the Gila County Courthouse in Globe, Arizona.
 The Charles Pugh House, built in 1897 and located at 356 N. Second Ave./ 362 N. Second Ave. (The 356 address is how the records show the house today. It was listed as 362 in older records.)
 The Louis Emerson House, built in 1902 and located at 623 N. Fourth St.
 The Concrete Block Bungalow, built in 1908 and located at 606 N. 9th St.
 The Leighton G. Knipe House, built in 1909 and located at 1025 N. 2nd Ave.
 The Sach's–Webster Farmstead House, built in 1909 and located in the Northwest corner of 75th Ave. and Baseline.
 The Sarah Pemberton House, built in 1920 and located at 1121 N. 2nd St.

Some of the properties listed in the Phoenix Historic Property Register are also listed in the National Register of Historic Places which is the United States federal government's official list of districts, sites, buildings, structures, and objects deemed worthy of preservation.

Historic Residential Districts
  

 Alvarado – Listed September 1992 (Period of Significance: 1907–1933)
 Ashland Place – Listed January 2003 (Period of Significance: 1920–1940)
 Brentwood – Listed April 2003 (Period of Significance: 1926–1956)
 Campus Vista – Listed April 2003 (Period of Significance: 1939–1956)
 Cheery Lynn – Listed February 1994 (Period of Significance: 1928–1945)
 Coronado – Listed January 2000 (Period of Significance: 1907–1942)
 Country Club Park – Listed January 1993 (Period of Significance: 1939–1946)
 Del Norte Place – Listed July 1993 (Period of Significance: 1927–1945)
 Earll Place – Listed April 2003 (Period of Significance: 1927–1942)
 East Alvarado – Listed May 1992 (Period of Significance: 1929–1942)
 East Evergreen – Listed November 1999 (Period of Significance: 1909–1929)
 Encanto-Palmcroft – Listed September 2005 (Period of Significance: 1920–1952)May 1992; boundary expansion January 2003 (Period of Significance: 1920–1940)
 Encanto Manor – Listed February 2006 (Period of Significance: 1945–1959)
 Encanto Vista – Listed April 2003 (Period of Significance: 1943–1953)
 Fairview Place – Listed February 1994 (Period of Significance: 1928–1948)
 F.Q. Story  – Listed March 1988; boundary adjustments March 2000, January 2004 (Period of Significance: 1921–1942)
 Garfield – Listed December 2001 (as Dennis Addition Historic District); December 2002 (as Garfield Place Historic District); district consolidation, expansion and name change February 2005; boundary adjustment November 2005 (Period of Significance: 1883–1942)
 Idylwilde Park – Listed June 1991 (Period of Significance: 1928–1941)
 La Hacienda – Listed April 2003 (Period of Significance: 1926–1954)
 Los Olivos – Listed December 2003 (Period of Significance: 1906–1935)
 Margarita Place – Listed October 1999 (Period of Significance: 1927–1949)
 Medlock Place – Listed April 2003 (Period of Significance: 1926–1956)
 North Encanto – Listed December 2002 (Period of Significance: 1939–1950)
 North Garfield – Listed December 2002 (as Moreland Street Historic District); district consolidation, expansion and name change February 2005 (Period of Significance: 1887–1942)
 Oakland – Listed September 1988; boundary expansion June 2006 (Period of Significance: 1887–1951)
 Phoenix Homesteads – Listed January 1990 (Period of Significance: 1935–1937)
 Pierson Place – Listed November 2005 (Period of Significance: 1924–1956)
 Roosevelt – Listed September 1986; boundary adjustments October 1991, December 1997, November 2004 (Period of Significance: 1895–1930)
 Roosevelt Park – Listed March 2003 (Period of Significance 1924–1942)
 Villa Verde – Listed January 1999 (Period of Significance: 1928–1940)
 Willo – Listed June 2006 (Period of Significance: 1910–1956)
 Windsor Square – Listed July 1996 (Period of Significance: 1912–1945)
 Woodland – Listed February 1989; boundary expansion December 2002 (Period of Significance: 1880–1935)
 Woodlea – Listed January 1999 (Period of Significance: 1928–1949)
 Yaple Park – Listed June 1997 (Period of Significance: 1928–1940)

Historic Non-Residential Districts

Individual properties

Further reading

See also

 Phoenix, Arizona
 List of historic properties in Phoenix
 National Register of Historic Places listings in Phoenix, Arizona
 History of Phoenix, Arizona
Pioneer and Military Memorial Park
Sunnyslope, Arizona
Pioneer Living History Museum
USS Arizona salvaged artifacts

Historic structures in Phoenix with articles
 Buildings and structures in Phoenix, Arizona
Smurthwaite House
El Cid Castle
Windsor Hotel
Squaw Peak Inn
 National Register of Historic Places listings in Maricopa County, Arizona

References

History of Phoenix, Arizona
.Historic properties
Historic properties
Culture of Phoenix, Arizona